Johnny Mantz (September 18, 1918 – October 25, 1972) was an American racecar driver.

Champ car
He made 17 starts in the AAA Championship Car series from 1948 to 1952, capturing a victory in his rookie season at the Milwaukee Mile as well as winning the Indianapolis Sweepstakes at Williams Grove Speedway.

Carrera Panamericana
He was a member of the Lincoln team in the first Carrera Panamericana in Mexico in 1950. He and Bill Stroppe were able to lead quite a bit of the multi-day race. With the finish line in sight and no more spare tires to run, Mantz was forced to run on rims and limped across the finish line ending up 9th.

Stock car
He was the first USAC Stock Car national champ in 1956.
Mantz also made 12 NASCAR Grand National starts from 1950–1951 and 1955-1956. He won in his third NASCAR race, the first Southern 500 held at Darlington Raceway. This was the first 500-mile race in the history of NASCAR. The newly built Darlington Raceway was also the first "Super Speedway" for NASCAR, even though it was a little under a mile and a half in size. The Southern 500 was also the only paved event for NASCAR in 1950. The classification for Super Speedways would later mean 2 miles and up. Mantz and his Plymouth were the race's slowest qualifier, almost 10 MPH slower than the pole winner, Curtis Turner. But because he qualified on the 9th of 15 days of time trials, he started 43rd in the 75 car field.  Mantz fitted truck tires that did not wear quickly or blow out, while his competitors had to stop often to pit for new tires. It was his only NASCAR win. He would win by 9 laps over the second-place finisher, Fireball Roberts, with an average speed of 75.250MPH. The race took more than 6 hours to run. Other than the car number, Mantz had one lone sponsorship decal on his car which was placed by the Justice Brothers for the product they were distributing. As of 2010, the speedway presents the Johnny Mantz trophy to the winner of the Southern 500.

Mantz was also the first person to try and bring NASCAR sanctions to the West Coast of the United States. Mantz's last stock car race was in Pomona, California in 1958. He won this race.

Complete AAA Championship Car results

Indianapolis 500
He made two starts in the Indianapolis 500. They were 1948 and 1949. He started 8th in 1948 and finished a black-flagged 13th, completing 185 laps. In 1949 he started 9th and finished 7th, completing all 200 laps. In 1953 he drove relief for Walt Faulkner.

World Championship career summary
The Indianapolis 500 was part of the FIA World Championship from 1950 through 1960. Drivers competing at Indy during those years were credited with World Championship points and participation. In the 1953 Indianapolis 500, Mantz drove in relief of Walt Faulkner. As a result of this shared ride, Mantz participated in 1 World Championship race, but he scored no World Championship points.

Ford Spokesperson
Mantz was featured in several magazine advertisements for Ford cars in the early 1960s.

Death
He died at 54 years old in a fatal car accident near Ojai, California.

References 

1918 births
1972 deaths
Indianapolis 500 drivers
NASCAR drivers
Road incident deaths in California
People from Porter County, Indiana
Racing drivers from Indiana
AAA Championship Car drivers
World Sportscar Championship drivers
USAC Stock Car drivers
Carrera Panamericana drivers